The "Twenty Negro Law", also known as the "Twenty Slave Law" and the "Twenty Nigger Law", was a piece of legislation enacted by the Confederate Congress during the American Civil War. The law specifically exempted from Confederate military service one white man for every twenty slaves owned on a Confederate plantation, or for two or more plantations within five miles of each other that collectively had twenty or more slaves. Passed as part of the Second Conscription Act in 1862, the law was a reaction to United States President Abraham Lincoln's preliminary Emancipation Proclamation, which was issued barely three weeks earlier. The law addressed Confederate fears of a slave rebellion due to so many white men being absent from home, as they were fighting in the Confederate Army. The Confederacy enacted the first conscription laws in United States history, and the percentage of Confederate soldiers who were conscripts was nearly double that of Union soldiers.

Background
By the spring of 1862, the Confederate Army was facing the prospect of a severe manpower shortage, since the twelve-month terms of most initial enlistees were expiring, and far fewer men were re-enlisting than had been hoped for. The First Conscription Act, passed by the Confederate Congress in April 1862, attempted to address this problem by making all white Southern men between 18 and 35 liable for compulsory military service. Though the South exempted several categories of men in occupations related to transportation, communications, the ministry, teaching and medicine, it did not exempt overseers. This left many plantations entirely in the charge of white women, elderly white men, or minors; these were not seen as being particularly able to maintain slave discipline, or to react effectively to prevent or suppress any unrest.

The Conscription Act proved extremely unpopular with many Confederate soldiers. Sam Watkins, a private in Company H, 1st Tennessee Infantry, wrote about his reaction and those of several of his service mates to this new law, in his book Company Aytch:

Enactment of the law
When Abraham Lincoln issued his Emancipation Proclamation on September 22, 1862, many in the Confederacy (and in the North, including George McClellan) believed that the Union president was specifically trying to foment a slave rebellion.  Partly to address this concern, and partly to address other issues related to the First Conscription Act, the Confederate Congress passed its Second Conscription Act on October 11, 1862, which included a provision that read:

While this new provision provoked little criticism in some areas of the Confederacy, such as Virginia, it proved extremely unpopular with much of the rank-and-file soldiery in the Confederate Army. Sam Watkins writes of his own feelings toward this particular provision:

According to historian Eric Foner:

In spite of the great displeasure the law caused, few men actually were affected by the law. For example, out of the roughly 38,000 overseers living in the South in 1860, 200 in Virginia, 120 in North Carolina, 201 in Georgia, and 300 in South Carolina won exemptions.

Later developments

Partly in response to such criticism, the Confederate Congress amended the Second Conscription Act in May 1863, requiring among other things that any person exempted under the so-called "Twenty Negro Law" had to have been an overseer prior to April 16, 1862, on plantations that had not been divided after October 11, 1862 (as some plantation owners had been dividing their holdings so as to exempt more overseers). Furthermore, only plantations under the control of a minor, a single woman, a person of unsound mind, or a person who was serving in the Confederate military could qualify, and a $500 fee was required to process the application.  The Third Conscription Act of February 1864 dropped the number of slaves from 20 to 15, but in turn required the person so exempted to sell to the Confederacy at government-set prices one hundred pounds of bacon and/or beef for each slave, with the surplus to be sold to soldiers' families, also at government prices.

With the defeat of the Confederacy in 1865, the "Twenty Negro Law" ceased to exist.

References

See also
Confederate Conscription Acts 1862–1864

1862 in American law
1862 in the Confederate States of America
1st Confederate States Congress
19th-century American slaves
American slave owners
Confederate States of America legislation
Plantations in the United States
United States slavery law